Deborah Ombres (born Javier Díaz, Valladolid, Spain, 3 November 1975) is a drag queen, conductor and actor.  Díaz moved to Madrid to study theatre, dance and martial arts,  and started working in theatres with Mamá, quiero ser drágstica (Mummy, I want to be a drag queen) before starting to work for the Spanish division of MTV, MTV Spain, in MTV Hot. Díaz has worked in other TV shows: La Selva de los Famosos, CQC and Rompecorazones.

Díaz's stage name, Deborah Ombres, is a play on words in Spanish. It sounds exactly the same as Devorahombres (which means, literally, "men-devourer"), a compound word formed from devorar (to devour) and hombres (men).

References 

1975 births
Living people
People from Valladolid
Spanish drag queens
Spanish male stage actors
Spanish television presenters
Spanish women television presenters
Spanish male television actors
21st-century LGBT people